Ľubomír Urgela (born 29 January 1990) is a Slovak footballer who plays as a striker for FK Sitno Banská Štiavnica.

Career
After about two years in Austria with SC/ESV Parndorf, Urgela returned to Slovakia in May 2021 to join FK Sitno Banská Štiavnica.

External links

MFK Dubnica profile

References

1990 births
Living people
Sportspeople from Žiar nad Hronom
Association football forwards
Slovak footballers
FK Dubnica players
MŠK Rimavská Sobota players
PFK Piešťany players
Spartak Myjava players
MFK Karviná players
FC Baník Ostrava players
FC ViOn Zlaté Moravce players
SC-ESV Parndorf 1919 players
FK Sitno Banská Štiavnica players
Slovak Super Liga players
2. Liga (Slovakia) players
Czech National Football League players
Austrian Regionalliga players
Austrian Landesliga players
Expatriate footballers in the Czech Republic
Slovak expatriate sportspeople in the Czech Republic
Expatriate footballers in Austria
Slovak expatriate sportspeople in Austria